The RiverLink Ferry is a passenger ferry service in the United States. The ferry crosses the Delaware River, connecting the Camden Waterfront, in Camden, New Jersey, with Penn's Landing, in Philadelphia, Pennsylvania. The ferry operates daily from May through September, and on Fridays through Sundays in April and October. Primarily, the system provides tourists with a means to reach waterfront attractions. The service carries over 200,000 passengers per year and first turned a profit in 2006.

History 
The ferry service initiated operations in March 1992. 

Between April 1, 2000 and 2015 the service was operated by the Delaware River Port Authority (DRPA). The DRPA originally agreed to take over its operation in November 1999. Service is provided by Freedom Ferry, a 600-passenger vessel managed by Hornblower Marine Services. On June 3, 2005, Hornblower also began offering Delaware River ferry tours under the name "Harbor Tours."

In 2000, the United States Department of Transportation, Federal Highway Administration provided a grant of $1,306,500 for the purchase and conversion of a second vessel. This vessel, which became the Freedom Ferry, began operating in 2003 and eventually replaced the original vessel.

On October 31, 2005, the DRPA announced it had received federal funding of $7.3 million for improvements to the ferry's dock in Philadelphia, comprising $3.3 million up front plus $1 million a year for four years.

In 2015, DRPA sold the RiverLink Ferry to the Delaware River Waterfront Corporation and the Cooper's Ferry Partnership.

See also 

List of crossings of the Delaware River

References

External links 

Crossings of the Delaware River
Ferries of New Jersey
Ferries of Pennsylvania
Transportation in Philadelphia
Delaware River Port Authority
Transportation in Camden, New Jersey
1992 establishments in New Jersey
1992 establishments in Pennsylvania